Big Knockout Boxing (BKB) is a combat sport brand developed and owned by DirecTV, a subsidiary of AT&T The sport is essentially similar to contemporary professional boxing but utilizing a round-shaped non-lifted solid-base ring, which does not use ropes, corners, and three minute rounds.

History
BKB was created by a group of experienced members of the fight industry. In 2013, the sport debuted with two events in New Hampshire. The Nevada Athletic Commission sanctioned BKB in March 2014. In August 2014, BKB debuted with a pay-per-view card at the Mandalay Bay Events Center in Las Vegas with approximately 4,500 attendees. Bryan Vera and Gabriel Rosado fought for the middleweight title. Rosado defeated Vera by the sixth-round TKO and won the title. Additionally, Anthony Johnson beat Dimar Ortuz by split decision for the cruiserweight title, David Estrada beat Eddie Caminero by unanimous decision for the junior middleweight title, and Javier Garcia beat Darnell Jiles by fifth-round TKO for the welterweight title. For the event, fighters wore traditional boxing gloves. In December 2014, BKB signed multi-fight agreements with Gabe Duluc, Javier Garcia, Herbert Acevedo, Khurshid Abdullaev, and Anthony Johnson. BKB held its second pay-per-view event at the Mandalay Bay led by Rosado and Curtis Stevens in April 2015. The seven-round title fight ended in a draw. Additionally, the event marked the first time the HitChip stats were used. The undercard saw the BKB debut of veteran Jesus Soto Karass defeating Ed Paredes, Anthony Johnson successfully defending the cruiserweight title versus Joey Montoya, David Estrada losing the junior middleweight title to Khurshid Abdullaev, and Javier Garcia losing the welterweight title to Jonathan Chicas. The event also featured BKB's first women's fight. The lightweight championship fight was between Diana Prazak and Layla McCarter and resulted in a win for McCarter with a seventh-round technical knockout over Prazak. The third BKB pay-per-view event was held in June 2015, again at the Mandalay Bay, and featured BKB veteran Julian Pollard defeat Rodney Hernandez (late replacement for kickboxing champion Tyrone Spong) by unanimous decision for the heavyweight title. The undercard featured another MMA veteran, Chris Spång, defeating Samuel Horowitz, the returns of Jesus Soto Karass and Ed Paredes (both lost to Adrian Granados and Janks Trotter, respectively), and the successful BKB debut of Shane Mosley Jr., son of boxer Shane Mosley. On July 22, 2015, Mosley Jr. and Pollard were suspended by the Nevada State Athletic Commission for failing their post-fight drug tests. BKB hasn't held any events since June 2015, and has no future events scheduled.

Results

BKB 1

BKB 2

BKB 3

Rules

The pit
BKB is contested in a 17-foot diameter circular surface known as "the pit". The pit's area is approximately half the size of a conventional 20-foot boxing ring (227 to 400 ft2). The small fighting surface is aimed to make fighters confront one another. Referees can deduct one point from a fighter if they intentionally step outside of the pit, that is enclosed by a raised padded area instead of rope.

Rounds
Rounds under BKB rules last only two minutes, unlike traditional boxing's three-minute rounds. Title fights are seven rounds long and non-title bouts are five rounds long.

Attire
Fighters wear conventional boxing gloves. BKB developed the first in-glove microchip technology, known as HitChip, that provides viewers with statistics, including the speed of a punch and the pounds of force delivered by the punch.

Current champions

References

Boxing